The Murmansk–Vladivostok Expedition Trophy is the world's longest winter motor rally. It runs 12,500 km from the Kola Bay lighthouse, Murmansk in north-west Russia to Zolotoi Rog bay lighthouse, Vladivostok in Far Eastern Russia, and is also the longest rally entirely within one country. The rally was first held in 2005 to celebrate the completion of the Trans-Siberian highway in 2004. 

The rally comprises two-vehicle teams, each vehicle containing three people, and at least one person on each team must be female. The race follows the route Murmansk - St. Petersburg - Moscow - Yekaterinburg - Novosibirsk - Krasnoyarsk - Irkutsk - Khabarovsk - Vladivostok, with teams being eliminated at the end of each stage, and the total journey taking 13 days. The ultimate winners of the race are also awarded 10 kg of pure gold.

References 
 Russian Winter Rally sets Record - BBC Online report on the 2005 race.
 Gold rush auto rally starts for Vladivostok - Vladivostok News reporting the start of the 2005 race.

External links 
 
 Press release on the official site on the selection of the first 2006 competitors.

Rally competitions in Russia
Road rallying